The 1952 Milan–San Remo was the 43rd edition of the Milan–San Remo cycle race and was held on 19 March 1952. The race started in Milan and finished in San Remo. The race was won by Loretto Petrucci.

General classification

References

1952
1952 in road cycling
1952 in Italian sport
1952 Challenge Desgrange-Colombo
March 1952 sports events in Europe